The Saru Taqi Mosque, built during the Safavid dynasty, is located in the bazaar of Hassanabad in Isfahan, .

References

Mosques in Isfahan
Mosque buildings with domes
National works of Iran
Safavid architecture